The Adjarian Autonomous Soviet Socialist Republic (Adjarian ASSR or Adzhar ASSR;) was an autonomous republic of the Soviet Union within the Georgian SSR, established on 16 July 1921. After the dissolution of the Soviet Union in 1991, it became the Autonomous Republic of Adjara within Georgia.

Establishment 

After a temporary occupation by Turkish and British troops in 1918–1920, Ajaria was reunited with Georgia in 1920. A brief military conflict in March 1921 prompted the government in Ankara to cede the territory to Georgia as a consequence of Article VI of the Treaty of Kars, with the condition for autonomy to be provided for the Muslim population. Accordingly, the Soviet Union established the Adjarian Autonomous Soviet Socialist Republic on 16 July 1921. Nonetheless, Islam within the new republic, as elsewhere in the Soviet Union and in common with Christianity, was persecuted and repressed.

See also 
First Secretary of the Adjar Communist Party

References

Politics of Adjara
History of Adjara
Autonomous republics of the Soviet Union
20th century in Georgia (country)
Georgian Soviet Socialist Republic
States and territories established in 1921
States and territories disestablished in 1990
Former socialist republics
1921 establishments in Russia
1990 disestablishments in the Soviet Union